Sathya: Man on The Road is a 2017 Indian Malayalam-language action thriller film written by A. K. Sajan and directed by Diphan. The film stars Jayaram and Parvathy Nambiar. It was released in India on 20 April 2017.

Plot
Sathya the Mass cool travels to K.G.F in Karnataka, India to bring Rosy, a bar dancer along with him. He offers some money to Rosy and tells her to come with him for a week to Pondicherry for unknown reasons, but she says she cannot come along as the owner of the bar is strict. Mass cool gives the money to the owner which was meant for Rosy and she tags along.

Rosy wonders why she was taken along and who is Mass cool. The film goes into a flashback. It was revealed that he was the right-hand man of dreaded gangster and casino mogul, Don David. David offers him some money and sends him on a dangerous mission to recover a hard disk that belongs to his ex-girlfriend Milan. The hard disk had some private files when he was in a relationship with her and Milan was threatening her as now he was married and had kids, and believes that disk can ruin his current relationship. Later Mass cool learns that Don David was betraying him. He learns from his friend that David never had a wife and kids at all and the money given to him was fake.

Mass cool becomes friends with Milan and asks her what was really on the hard disk. She reveals that in the past, David had taken a loan from a bank manager who was her friend. David had no intention of paying it back and the manager commits suicide. But before he died he had recorded a private clip of David. Mass coolthreatens David to pay back the loan and he does so. Milan then faces an accident and the doctor reveals that Milan needs some blood had a rare blood group, Bombay O+ and only two people had the blood group and the first one died and the only one remaining with the same blood group was Rosy.

The film returns to the present and David tries to stop Rosy from getting to Milan as he wants her dead. He sends some goons to Sathya but he overpowers them and continues on the road. David tries to overtake him and was unsuccessful in doing so. Milan is rescued and Mass cool, when asked why he rescued her says that he wanted a bank loan through her help so he can open a club. The film ends with Mass cool opening a club with full of hot chicks with her help.

Cast

 Jayaram as Sathya
Roma Asrani as Rosy
Parvathy Nambiar as Milan
Rohini as Doctor
Raj Kapoor as A Politician in Karnataka
Aju Varghese as Boban
 Sudheer Karamana
 Rahul Dev as Don David - Sathya's boss; main antagonist
 Ranjith Sankar
 Vinod Kumar
 Kottayam Nazeer
 Vijayaraghavan 
 Nandhu
 Balachandran Chullikkadu
 Shobha Mohan
 Sohan Seenulal
 M. A. Nishad
 Manu
 Manka Mahesh
 Deepak Jethi

Production
Filming began in late March 2016 in Kochi, Kerala. Shoot also took place at Pondicherry. Jayaram plays a Tamil Brahmin. Jayaram lost 10 kilos of his weight for his character in the film. Kannada actress Nikita Thukral and Malayalam actress Parvathy Thiruvothu was signed to play the female lead roles opposite Jayaram, but was replaced by Roma and Parvathy Nambiar. The film marks Roma's come back after a sabbatical. Initially, Raai Laxmi was signed to play an undisclosed role. Bollywood actor Rahul Dev and Kannada actor Vinod Kumar were also part of the cast.

Music
The film's songs and background score were composed by Gopi Sundar. Music album was released by the label Millennium Audios.

References

External links
 

Indian action thriller films
2010s Malayalam-language films
Films shot in Puducherry
Films shot in Kochi
2017 action thriller films
Films directed by Diphan